Liangtian is a town under the administration of Suxian District, Chenzhou, Hunan, China. , it has three residential communities and 23 villages under its administration.

References 

Towns of Chenzhou
Suxian District